Michal Horáček (born 1977) is a Czech orienteering competitor. He received a bronze medal in the relay at the 2001 World Orienteering Championships with the Czech team.

He participated in the World Cup in 1998 and 2000.

See also
 Czech orienteers
 List of orienteers
 List of orienteering events

References

1977 births
Living people
Czech orienteers
Male orienteers
Foot orienteers
World Orienteering Championships medalists
Junior World Orienteering Championships medalists